PDD often refers to Pervasive developmental disorder.

PDD may also refer to:

Medicine
 Parkinson's disease dementia
 Penile dysmorphic disorder
 Persistent depressive disorder, also known as dysthymia
 Persons with developmental disabilities
 Prescribed daily dose
 Progressive diaphyseal dysplasia, also known as Camurati–Engelmann disease
 Proventricular dilatation disease, also known as "macaw wasting disease"

Physics and Chemistry
 Percentage depth dose curve, the absorbed radiation dose in a medium, varying with depth.
 Pulsed discharge detector, a type of gas chromatography ion detector

Computing and Technology
 Physical device driver
 An alternative file extension for Portable Document Format files that are preferentially opened by Adobe Photoshop
 Process Driven Development, software development methodology
 Professional Disc for DATA or ProDATA, an optical disc format produced by Sony

Business and Law
 Pinduoduo, NASDAQ ticker PDD
 Project Design Document, a precise project description which serves as the basis for the Clean Development Mechanism (CDM) (project evaluation)
 Public Domain Day, an observance of when copyrights expire and works enter into the public domain

Politics
 Partnership for Democracy and Development in Central America
 Party for Democratic Action (Partija za demokratsko delovanje), a political party in Serbia
 Presidential Decision Directive, a kind of national security directive from the Bill Clinton presidency

Arts
 P. Diddy
 Pas de deux, a type of ballet dance
 Pinky Dinky Doo
 Please Don't Destroy